Héctor Joel Pérez (born 8 October 1983 in Asunción, Paraguay) is a Paraguayan footballer currently playing for Silvio Pettirossi of the Tercera Division in Paraguay.

Teams
  Silvio Pettirossi 2007
  Unión Española 2008–2009
  12 de Octubre 2009
  Silvio Pettirossi 2004–2006

References
 Profile at BDFA 
 

1983 births
Living people
Paraguayan footballers
Paraguayan expatriate footballers
12 de Octubre Football Club players
Unión Española footballers
Expatriate footballers in Chile
Association football midfielders